The Nivaclé are an indigenous people of the Gran Chaco. An estimated 13,700 Nivaclé people live in the President Hayes and Boquerón Departments in Paraguay, while approximately 200 Nivaclé people live in the Salta Province of Argentina. A very small number of Nivaclé live in Tarija, Bolivia.  

In the last 50 years, 15,000 Mennonites from Canada, Russia, and Germany have settled in traditional Nivaclé territory.

Groups
They have five subgroups, which are as follows:
 Tovoc Lhavos, river people: Chishamnee Lhavos, people from above
 Tovoc Lhavos, river people: Shichaam Lhavos, people from below
 Yita' Lhavos, forest people; this group is also known as C’utjaan Lhavos ‘people of the thorns’)
 Jotoi Lhavos, people of the esparto grass
 Tavashai Lhavos, people of the savanna.

Name
Nivaclé is an autonym, meaning "human." They are also known as the Ashlushlay, Axluslay, Chulupí, and Nivaklé people.

Language
They speak the Nivaclé language, which has two dialects: Forest Nivaclé and River Nivaclé. Nivaclé is one of the Mataco-Guaicuru languages. A dictionary has been published for the language, and the Bible was translated into Nivaclé in 1995.

External links

 Hombre de Guerra, documentary

Notes

Indigenous peoples in Argentina
Indigenous peoples in Bolivia
Indigenous peoples in Paraguay
Indigenous peoples of the Gran Chaco